Hyun Jin Preston Moon (born 25 May 1969) is a South Korean social entrepreneur, founder and chairman of the Global Peace Foundation, and later the Family Peace Association. His father, Sun Myung Moon, was the founder of the Unification movement, an international new religious movement.

Early life and education 
Born in South Korea, he moved to the United States at a young age and graduated from Columbia University, where he was a history major, and Harvard Business School with an M.B.A. in 1998. Moon is a humanitarian and social entrepreneur whose peacebuilding initiatives emphasize universal principles and values shared by the world's major religious and cultural traditions.

Political positions

Korean unification 
Moon has been involved in the campaign for Korean unification for a decade. In 2014, Moon wrote the book Korean Dream: A Vision for a Unified Korea. The book calls for greater public engagement with the unification issue, especially led by S. Korean civil society organizations working in partnership with government. He urged the S. Korean government to make unification its national agenda to lead global opinion, especially with heightened interest surrounding North's increased nuclear threats.

Moon's approach to unification appeals to a shared historic, 5,000-year Korean identity, and particularly the ancient Korean ethic named "Hongik Ingan," which means "to broadly benefit humanity." He states that with Hongik Ingan as the guiding vision, "Unification will set the moral precedent for aligning with our historic heritage and providential destiny... to shine the light of hope opening the path for all people in a world mired in conflict."

Moon described his book as shifting the focus from technical questions of process to clarifying the end goal of unification. "I ask what type of new nation should Koreans aspire to establish, and what shared vision and enduring principles should guide them towards it," Moon wrote.

The Korean Culture and Arts Publications recognized Korean Dream: A Vision for a Unified Korea as the 2014 "Book of the Year" in the society category. An English version with a foreword by The Heritage Foundation founder Edwin Feulner was published in December 2016. The book was included in the U.S. Defense Intelligence Agency's 2018 Professional Reading List under the "Global Analysis" category.

Moon founded Action for Korea United, an alliance currently consisting of over 800 Korean civic groups, in 2012. In 2015 the coalition launched the One Korea Global Campaign committee to garner global support for Korean Unification through the medium of popular culture, especially K-pop. They have held two 'One K Concerts' towards that aim, in Seoul, Korea and Manila, Philippines, featuring well-known artists.

New models of development 
Moon has advocated the need for new development models that bring material prosperity without compromising spiritual and moral traditions, including traditional family values. He has advocated the Korean development model Saemaul Undong of the 1970s for encouraging self-reliance and promoting high standards of education to strengthen human capital. He has encouraged Korean industry leaders to invest in development projects in Paraguay, noting the developing nation's potential to become a hub for industrialization, distribution and service fields in South America.

Economic reform 
Moon has pointed out the weaknesses of the South Korean economy since 2014. He presented a plan for economic reform to S. Korean business and government heads in preparation for peninsular unification. 

Moon also advocated for economic reform in the Philippines, calling for less government interference in the marketplace, saying the country could play a key role to economically lead ASEAN and promote peace and stability.

Youth leadership 
Moon has spoken at various venues and programs encouraging youth leadership as a significant resource to benefit the greater society by challenging conventional norms with fresh perspectives and passion.

Ventures

Global Peace Foundation
The Global Peace Foundation is an international nonprofit organization with a stated mission to promote "an innovative, values-based approach to peacebuilding." 

Moon asserts that peace efforts require effective approaches to preventing and resolving conflicts rooted in universal principles and values and a vision that can guide the formation of free and prosperous civil societies.

The Global Peace Foundation annually co-organizes the Global Youth Summit in the Philippines to engage and inspire young people in addressing the world's persistent problems.

Personal life
Moon regularly competed in equestrianism from a young age. He went on to become a two-time competitor at the Olympics as part of the South Korean team, competing in Seoul 1988 and Barcelona 1992 Olympics.

Family
The Moon family has pursued Korean Unification for 3 generations. Hyun Jin Preston Moon's great-uncle was a prominent member of the Korean anti-colonial movement, and helped draft the Korean Declaration of Independence. His father, Sun Myung Moon, founder of the Unification Church was at the forefront of engagement with North Korea starting in 1991.

References

External links
 Official website of Hyun Jin Preston Moon
 Official website of Global Peace Foundation
 Official landing page of Korean Dream: A Vision for a Unified Korea
 Official website for Service For Peace

1969 births
Living people
Equestrians at the 1988 Summer Olympics
Equestrians at the 1992 Summer Olympics
Harvard Business School alumni
Olympic equestrians of South Korea
South Korean male equestrians
Social entrepreneurs
Global Leadership Council
Columbia College (New York) alumni